Bowenoid papulosis is a cutaneous condition characterized by the presence of pigmented verrucous papules on the body of the penis. They are associated with human papillomavirus, the causative agent of genital warts. The lesions have a typical dysplastic histology and are generally considered benign, although a small percentage will develop malignant characteristics.

It is considered as a pre-malignant condition. Other terms used to describe the condition are: Erythroplasia of Queyrat, Squamous cell carcinoma in situ and Bowen's disease. The term bowenoid papulosis was coined in 1977 by Kopf and Bart and is named after dermatologist John Templeton Bowen.
The term "intraepithelial neoplasia" defines a premalignant intraepithelial change.

On the vulva it is termed VIN (vulvar or vulval intraepithelial neoplasia); on the penis, PIN (penile intraepithelial neoplasia); and on or around the anus, AIN (anal intraepithelial neoplasia). The terminology has been very confusing and it is now recommended that the terms Bowen's disease, erythroplasia of Queyrat, and bowenoid papulosis should not be used for lesions in the anogenital area. However, dermatologists still recognize a distinct clinical variant, bowenoid papulosis, characterized by discrete papules in a younger age group and a tendency for spontaneous regression. Additionally, some authorities believe that erythroplasia of Queyrat and Bowen's disease remain useful terms in men.

See also 
 Skin lesion
 Sexually transmitted infection

References

External links 

Epidermal nevi, neoplasms, and cysts
Virus-related cutaneous conditions
Papillomavirus-associated diseases